Ayatollah Muhammad Hassan Mirza Rida Quli (Persian: شریعت سنگلجی;  1891 –1944), known as Shari'at-Sanglaji (also spelt as Sharīʿat Sangalaji),  was an Iranian reformer, theologian, philosopher, and scholar. He was an opponent of Ruhollah Khomeini. He was considered a Qurʾan-oriented Scholar or Qurʾanist among Iranian Shias. He was the theologian who, unlike the majority of Shia Scholars, called for Ijtihad, and rejected Taqleed. Sangalli was a preacher in the Sepahsalar Mosque. He publicly declared that Shiaism required reformation. Besides, he preached that Islam is not against modernity.

Life and education
Ayatollah Muhammad Hassan Mirza Rida Quli Shari'at-Sanglaji was born in 1891 in Sangelaj, Tehran. His father's name was Shaykh Hasan Sangalaji (d. 1931). He received his early education from his father.

He obtained his Islamic Education from the following scholars:

 Islamic Jurisprudence (Fiqh) from Shaykh Abdul nabi Nuri
 Philosophy (Hikmat) from Mirza Hasan Karmanshahi
 Scholastic Theology (Kalam) from Shaykh Ali Mutakallim
 Mysticism (Irfan) from Mirza Hashim Ishkivari

In 1917, Muhammed traveled to Najaf with his brother Muhammad Sanglaji, where he spent four years. In Najaf, he wrote his first book, which was positively received by Ayatollah Kazim Yazdi. Yazdi gave Mirza Rida Quli the surname of Shariat, or "sacred law." In 1921, he returned to Tehran.

He died in January 1944 at the age of 53 due to typhus.

Teachings and Beliefs
The Oxford Handbook of Islamic Theology states:

"Modernist tendencies were not limited to Sunni scholars: in Iran, Ayatollah Muhammad Hasan (Riza Quill) Shariat Sangalaji (1890 or 1892-1944) called for Ijtihad instead of Taqlid. And advocated a strictly rational approach to Islam, and prompted his fellow believers to return to the pure origins of their religion by combating superstitions that had distorted its strict monotheism over time. What brought him into fierce conflict with his conservative colleagues was his assessment that also some beliefs traditionally regarded as belonging to the core of Imami Shi'ism are superstitious and must do. For instance, he rated the idea that the Twelfth Imam will return before resurrection to establish justice on earth as an illegitimate addition to Islam (Richard 1988: 166). He condemned the belief that the prophet and the imams are closer to God than ordinary people and can hence you may ask for intercession (shafa't). He also rejected the popular idea that al-Husayn's suffering and death were expiatory self-sacrifices, denouncing it as un-Islamic (Shariat Sangalaji, Tawhid, 63f., 140; Richard 1988:167; for Shi' I modernism in Iran and elsewhere, cf. Nasr 1993)."

Shariat Sanglaji had the following teachings and beliefs:

 He emphatically rejected the Return of the Twelfth Imam and wrote the book "Islam wa Rajat" to refute this particular Shiite belief.
 He was not in favor of sacred intermediaries and considered it polytheism.
 He was against tomb worship, and in his book Tawhid-i ibaadat - Yaktaparasti, he quoted narrations that prohibited building on graves and taking them as places of worship.
 While some Muslim scholars held the view that prophets like Jesus, Isa, and Khidr are alive, Sanglaji wrote a book Mahwo al Mawhoom to refute this belief. He stated that no prophet, including Jesus, is alive.

Students 
The main attendants of Sanglaji's lectures and Quranic exegesis were highly educated Iranians, amongst the most famous where:
 Ali-Akbar Davar
 Abdullah Entezam
 Asadollah Mobasheri
 Mehdi Bazargan
 Jalal Al-e-Ahmad

Books 

 Kilid-i Fahm-i Qur'an (Key to the Understanding of the Qur'an) 
 Tawhid-i ibadat - Yaktaparasti (The Unity of Worship- Monotheism)
 Islam wa Rajat

References 

1891 births
1944 deaths
20th-century Iranian writers
20th-century Iranian philosophers